Carex trisperma, the three-seeded sedge, is a species of flowering plant in the genus Carex, native to Canada, Greenland, and the northeastern United States. It is typically found in acidic bogs within forests.

Subtaxa
The following subspecies are currently accepted:
Carex trisperma  var. billingsii O.W.Knight
Carex trisperma var. trisperma

References

trisperma
Flora of Canada
Flora of Greenland
Flora of the Northeastern United States
Plants described in 1825
Flora without expected TNC conservation status